Tanda Putera (English: The Mark of a Prince) is a 2013 Malaysian history film directed by Shuhaimi Baba. The film chronicles the relationship between Tun Abdul Razak, who was the second Malaysian Prime Minister, and his then deputy Tun Dr Ismail set around the time after the 1969 racial riots. The film was intended to be released in Malaysian cinemas on 13 September 2012 but the release was delayed until 29 August 2013 due to some controversy regarding the portrayal of the racial riots being the plot point of the film. It is Shuhaimi Baba's sequel film to 1957: Hati Malaya in 2007.

Plot
The film is a fiction loosely based from the race riots of 1969, when the racial tension had reached its height. The film portrays the close friendship between the second Malaysian prime minister, Tun Abdul Razak and his deputy, Tun Dr Ismail. They were secretive about their health problems as they had the task of restoring the peace in their country following the events of 13 May 1969. Tun Razak was suffering from leukaemia and he had to keep it a secret from his family, so they both sought the services of Dr. Macpherson, who used his reading room as a secret clinic for his treatment.

Cast

Historical figures 
 Rusdi Ramli as Abdul Razak Hussein
 Zizan Nin as Ismail Abdul Rahman
 Faezah Elai as Rahah Mohammad Noah
 Linda Hashim as Norashikin Mohd Seth, Ismail's wife
 Hasnul Rahmat as Hussein Onn
 Kamarulzaman Taib as Tunku Abdul Rahman
 Nazril Idrus as Mahathir Mohamad
 Norman Hakim as Inspector-General Mohammed Hanif bin Omar
 Sakhee Shamsuddin as Najib Razak, Abdul Razak's son
Bell Ngasri as Harun Idris
 Amar Baharin as Tengku Razaleigh Hamzah
 Riz Amin as Ibrahim Ismail
 Azliyuszaini Mohd Noor as Mohamed Salleh Ismael

Fictional characters 
 Kavita Sidhu as Kara
 Riezman Khuzaimi as Sergeant Aman
 Kuza as Maimon
 Zaefrul Nordin as Corporal Musa
 Ika Nabila as Zarah
 Zoey Rahman as Johan
 Ahya U as Zaman
 Alan Yun as Allen
 Starley Wong as Father's Allen
 Razif Hashim as Ahmad Johari Abdul Razak
 Azma Aizal Yusoof as Mohamed Tawfik Ismail Ismail's son
 Ali Steven Shorthose as Dr. Macpherson
 Fizz Fairuz as Arshad Ayub
 Douglas Lim as Leslie Cheah
 Ida Nerina as Jah Steno
 Sharifah Shahirah as Headmaster
 Chelsia Ng as Catharine Lim Cheng Neo
 Chew Kin Wah as Tan Chong Chor

Historical accuracy 
Shuhaimi Baba had stated that the film is based on true historical facts and that it is not a propaganda and that the film is mainly about the friendship between Tun Razak and Tun Dr Ismail, while the 13 May incident is merely a backdrop to the film. However, Shuhaimi also mentioned that there were significant amounts of creative illustration and fictional content added in.

Reception

Critical response 
Aidil Rusli writing for The Star calls the film "an engaging experience" despite its "niggling faults" - its approach to an episodic narrative "having to cram everything into a two-hour movie", and "less-than-believable" CGI shots to illustrate the period the film was set in.

Umapagan Ampikaipakan, of radio station BFM 89.9, on the review website UmaandJoe.com says that the film glorified Abdul Razak and Dr Ismail at the expense of their predecessor Tunku Abdul Rahman; that it had "made Tunku look like a blithering fool. It made him look toothless. [...] when you tell the story, you don’t undermine another leader. You don’t say Bill Clinton was great but JFK was a loser.” His co-host Johanan Sen observed on the production aspect of the film where its first half "looks like an unfinished History Channel special without voiceovers done or without any proper historians being interviewed. [...] ...a re-enactment footage arranged together without proper narrative."

Erna Mahyuni of Malay Mail, in a scathing commentary of the film that was widely circulated online, also stated of its seemingly lacking of a coherent narrative; with the ensemble cast's performance having "the collective expressiveness of IKEA furniture". The performance of lead actor Rusdi Ramli in particular was derided for his "unconvincing" expressions and "forced" chemistry with co-actor Zizan Nin, the latter aspect coming across as "a parody of bromance". Erni further wrote that the movie appeared to have negationist undertones against the 1969 riots and it negatively portrayed the two statesmen protagonists "as pompous idiots who do not trust their wives".

There was also some common ground regarding how the central characters of Abdul Razak and Ismail, and their wives had been miscast by more younger actors.

Box-office 
The movie failed to collect back its budget, affected by the Penang screening ban and intense competition with other international movies that were also showing in cinemas at the time such as Kick-Ass 2 and The Mortal Instruments: City of Bones. In addition, another local movie that was released at about the same time titled KL Zombi surpassed it and the aforementioned international films to hit second place in opening weekend takings between 29 August and 4 September alone, with only Elysium beating it at first place.

Controversies and issues

Penang ban, viewing advisory and screening 
Before the release of the film, it sparked controversies about the accuracy of its contents after the release of the trailer in relation to the 13 May riots. Opposition lawmakers alleged that the film portrayed the Chinese and the Democratic Action Party (DAP) in a negative light. Further controversy was caused after there were allegations that the film's official Facebook page featured a picture of opposition lawmaker Lim Kit Siang being carried away by a group of uniformed officials with captions claiming that Lim had urinated on the Selangor flag in the house of former Selangor chief minister Harun Idris. Lim denied the allegation in response and said that the picture featuring him in the Facebook page was actually taken in Sabah in 1984. The director Shuhaimi Baba also denied that Lim was to be featured in the film.

On 28 August 2013, the Penang state government had sent out advisory directives to all cinema operators in the state to not screen the movie. Chief Minister Lim Guan Eng had claimed that there are slanderous scenes that could provoke racial hatred. However, less than 24 hours after the directives were issued on 29 August, the state government issued another contradictory letter stating they were merely "advised" against screening it, instead of otherwise banning it. Cinemas in Penang eventually screened the movie despite the state government's advisory. Communications and Multimedia Minister Ahmad Shabery Cheek said the movie would reach cinemas in Penang starting 31 August 2013.

References

External links
 

2013 films
Malaysian historical films
Malaysian political films
Malay-language films
Chinese-language Malaysian films
English-language Malaysian films
Films directed by Shuhaimi Baba
Pesona Pictures films
Films produced by Shuhaimi Baba
Films with screenplays by Shuhaimi Baba
Film controversies in Malaysia
2013 controversies